Vivian Weston (22 May 1914 – 7 May 1979) was a former Scotland international rugby union player. He played at Flanker but could also fill in at Lock.

Rugby Union career

Amateur career

Weston played for Kelvinside Academicals.

In the Second World War, Weston enlisted in the British Army. He played for the Army rugby union side against France on 1 January 1945, turning out as a Lock.

Provincial career

Weson played for Glasgow District against Edinburgh District in the Inter-City match of 5 December 1936. Glasgow won the match 11 - 3, with Weston and his Kelvinside Academical teammate I. McLachlan combining to set up Robert Wilson Shaw for a try. The Glasgow Herald noted that Weston was one of the Forwards in the match that may have impressed the Scotland selectors.

International career

He was capped for Scotland twice in 1936. He made his debut in the Home Nations match against Ireland on 22 February 1936 and made his final appearance against England on 21 March 1936.

Family

His grandson Jamie Weston became a professional rugby union player turning out for Glasgow Warriors, Edinburgh and the Border Reivers.

References

1914 births
1979 deaths
Scottish rugby union players
Scotland international rugby union players
Glasgow District (rugby union) players
Kelvinside Academicals RFC players
Rugby union players from Glasgow
Rugby union flankers